The Rally for Democracy and Progress  (CRP) is a political party in Gabon.

History
The party won one seat in the National Assembly in the 1996 parliamentary elections. The following year it won a seat in the Senate.

The party nominated six candidates for the 2011 National Assembly elections, but failed to win a seat.

References

Political parties in Gabon